She Remembers Everything is Rosanne Cash's fourteenth album. The album was released on November 2, 2018, as well as Cash's second album for Blue Note Records. The album was produced by Tucker Martine, and Cash's husband John Leventhal, Cash co-wrote every song on the album. The track "Crossing to Jerusalem" received a Grammy Award for Best American Roots Song nomination at the 62nd Grammy Awards.

Critical Reception
{{Album ratings
 | MC = 80/100
 | rev1 = AllMusic
 | rev1Score = <ref>{{cite web|url=https://www.allmusic.com/album/she-remembers-everything-mw0003210187|title=She Remembers Everything' - Rosanne Cash : Songs, Reviews, Credits, Awards|last=Deming|first=Mark|date=November 2, 2018|publisher=AllMusic|accessdate=August 2, 2020}}</ref>
 | rev2 = Chicago Tribune | rev2score = 
 | rev3 = Paste | rev3score = 7.7/10
 | rev4 = Pitchfork | rev4Score = 7.6/10
}}She Remembers Everything received positive reviews from critics. Writing for Rolling Stone, Will Hermes described the album as a "master class in channeling life into song" and added that "Cash is one of the most ambitious and literary songwriters of her generation" who "goes especially deep on this set", describing how "sometimes the songs appear to conjure autobiography, like “Everyone But Me,” which involves the loss of a mother and father" and "other times she puts more distance between self and subject". Of the album's genre, he noted that Cash "remains hard to categorize, refracting country alongside rock, folk and other elements befitting a longtime resident of New York City’s melting pot". Hermes considers "8 God's of Harlem" as the album's "standout" track and also highlights closing track "My Least Favorite Life", describing it as "the album’s dark lodestar" and a " a sweetly grim waltz with an Eastern European lilt, Brechtian existentialism and a little Tom Waits-ian surrealism" and concludes that "in her narrative hands, it’s comforting not to be traveling alone".

In a similarly positive review, Mark Deming of AllMusic notes that "while [Cash] sounds fresh and vital on every track, the music clearly speaks of experience and maturity" and describes the album as " the work of a musician and songwriter who knows her craft inside and out" with a "lyrical voice full of compassion and lacking in fear or hesitancy", explaining that " Cash is willing to share what lurks in her mind and her heart, and she has the tools to articulate her ideas with literacy and passion in equal measure" through songs that are "rich, nuanced, and never simplistic". He concludes by saying that "She Remembers Everything'' is a challenging and rewarding set from an artist who is at the peak of her abilities, and if anyone needs to be reminded that Rosanne Cash is one of America's best and smartest songwriters, all they need to do is spend some time with these songs."

Track listing
Adapted from AllMusic

Chart performance

Personnel

Ames Asbell - viola
Eric Baker - art direction, art design
Stephen Barber - string arrangement
Jay Bellerose - drums
Wes Bender - photography
Joe Bonadio - drums
David Boyle - string engineer
Rob Burger - accordion, keyboards, organ, piano, pump organ, vibraphone, backing vocals
Rosanne Cash - vocals, guitar
Justin Chase - assistant engineer, acoustic guitar, mellotron, piano
Elvis Costello - guest vocals, acoustic guitar
Paul Dalen - production assistant
Jill Dell'Abate - production assistant
Rick DePoi - engineer
Don Dixon - photography
Dave Eggar - cello
Monique Evelyn - assistant engineer, production assistant
Ryan Freeland - engineer, mixing
Eric Gorfain - vocal engineer
Joe Henry - producer (track 13)
Jessica Meyer - viola
Zev Katz - bass guitar
Jill Krementz - photography
Kris Kristofferson - guest vocals
Jakob Leventhal - engineer
John Leventhal - arranger, bass guitar, drums, engineer, electric guitar, harmonium, mandolin, mixing, organ, pedal steel, piano, producer, upright bass, string arrangements, background vocals
Adam Levy - acoustic guitar
Bob Ludwig - mastering
Leigh Mahoney - violin
Tucker Martine - engineer, producer, mixing
Lauren McIntosh - calligraphy
Colin Meloy - harmony vocals
Jip Moors - photography
Maxim Moston - violin
Portia Munson - cover art
Sarah Nelson - cello
Sam Phillips - harmony vocals
David Piltch - electric bass
Jason Quigley - photography
Dan Reiser - drums, percussion
Sebastian Steinberg - bass guitar, backing vocals
Helge Thelen - photography
Katherine Thomas - violin
Patrick Warren - mellotron, piano
Tim Young - baritone guitar, electric guitar, backing vocals

References

2018 albums
Rosanne Cash albums
Blue Note Records albums
Albums produced by John Leventhal